Urtica dioica, often known as common nettle, burn nettle, stinging nettle (although not all plants of this species sting) or nettle leaf, or just a nettle or stinger, is a herbaceous perennial flowering plant in the family Urticaceae. Originally native to Europe, much of temperate Asia and western North Africa, it is now found worldwide, including New Zealand and North America. The species is divided into six subspecies, five of which have many hollow stinging hairs called trichomes on the leaves and stems, which act like hypodermic needles, injecting histamine and other chemicals that produce a stinging sensation upon contact ("contact urticaria", a form of contact dermatitis).

The plant has a long history of use as a source for traditional medicine, food, tea, and textile raw material in ancient (such as Saxon) and modern societies.

Description 

It has widely spreading rhizomes and stolons, which are bright yellow, as are the roots. The leaves have a strongly serrated margin, a cordate base, and an acuminate tip with a terminal leaf tooth longer than adjacent laterals. It bears small, greenish or brownish, numerous flowers in dense axillary inflorescences.

The leaves and stems are very hairy with non-stinging hairs, and in most subspecies, also bear many stinging hairs (trichomes or spicules), whose tips come off when touched, transforming the hair into a needle that can inject several chemicals causing a painful sting or paresthesia, giving the species its common names: stinging nettle, burn-nettle, burn-weed, or burn-hazel.

Taxonomy 

The taxonomy of Urtica species has been confused, and older sources are likely to use a variety of systematic names for these plants. Formerly, more species were recognised than are now accepted. However, at least six clear subspecies of U. dioica are described, some formerly classified as separate species:
U. dioica subsp. dioica (European stinging nettle), from Europe, Asia, and northern Africa, has stinging hairs.
U. dioica subsp. galeopsifolia (fen nettle or stingless nettle), from Europe, does not have stinging hairs.
U. dioica subsp. afghanica, from southwestern and central Asia, sometimes has stinging hairs or is sometimes hairless.
U. dioica subsp. gansuensis, from eastern Asia (China), has stinging hairs.
U. dioica subsp. gracilis (Ait.) Selander (American stinging nettle), from North America, has stinging hairs and is monoecious.
U. dioica subsp. holosericea (Nutt.) Thorne (hoary stinging nettle), from North America, has stinging hairs and is monoecious.

Other species' names formerly accepted as distinct by some authors but now regarded as synonyms of one or other subspecies include U. breweri, U. californica, U. cardiophylla, U. lyalli, U. major, U. procera, U. serra, U. strigosissima, U. trachycarpa, and U. viridis.

Etymology 
Urtica is derived from a Latin word meaning 'sting'.

Dioica (δίοικος) is derived from Greek, meaning 'of two houses' (having separate staminate and pistillate plants; dioecious).

Distribution and habitat 

U. dioica is considered to be native to Europe, much of temperate Asia and western North Africa. It is abundant in northern Europe and much of Asia, usually found in the countryside. It is less widespread in southern Europe and north Africa, where it is restricted by its need for moist soil, but is still common. It has been introduced to many other parts of the world. In North America, it is widely distributed in Canada and the United States, where it is found in every province and state except for Hawaii, and also can be found in northernmost Mexico. It grows in abundance in the Pacific Northwest, especially in places where annual rainfall is high. The European subspecies has been introduced into Australia, North America and South America.

In Europe, nettles have a strong association with human habitation and buildings. The presence of nettles may indicate the site of a long-abandoned building, and can also indicate soil fertility. Human and animal waste may be responsible for elevated levels of phosphate and nitrogen in the soil, providing an ideal environment for nettles.

Ecology 

Nettles are the larval food plant for several species of butterflies, such as the peacock butterfly, comma (Polygonia c-album), and the small tortoiseshell. It is also eaten by the larvae of some moths including angle shades, buff ermine, dot moth, the flame, the gothic, grey chi, grey pug, lesser broad-bordered yellow underwing, mouse moth, setaceous Hebrew character, and small angle shades. The roots are sometimes eaten by the larva of the ghost moth (Hepialus humuli).

It is a known host to the pathogenic fungus Phoma herbarum.

Stinging nettle is particularly found as an understory plant in wetter environments, but it is also found in meadows. Although nutritious, it is not widely eaten by either wildlife or livestock, presumably because of the sting. It spreads by abundant seeds and also by rhizomes, and is often able to survive and re-establish quickly after fire.

Cultivation

Field

Sowing and planting 
Three cultivation techniques can be used for the stinging nettle: 1) direct sowing, 2) growing seedlings in nurseries with subsequent transplantation and 3) vegetative propagation via stolons or head cuttings.

 Direct sowing: The seedbed should have a loose and fine structure, but should be reconsolidated using a packer roller imminently prior to sowing. Sowing time can be either in autumn or in spring. The disadvantage of direct sowing is that it usually leads to incomplete plant coverage. This drawback can be mitigated by covering the seedbed with a transparent perforated foil in order to improve seed germination. Further, weed control can be problematic as the stinging nettle has a slow seedling development time.
 Growing seedlings: For this technique pre-germinated seeds are sown between mid-/end-February and beginning of April and grown in nurseries. Seedlings are grown in tuffs with 3–5 plants/tuff and a seed density of 1.2–1.6 kg/1000 tuffs. A fastened germination is achieved by alternating high temperature during daytime (30 °C for 8 h) and lower temperature during nighttime (20 °C for 16 h). Before transplanting, the seedlings should be fertilized and acclimated to cold temperatures.
Head cuttings are grown in nurseries starting between mid-May and mid-June. Growing tips with two leaf pairs are cut from the mother plant and treated with root-growth inducing hormones. Transplantation can be delayed in comparison to the growing seedling technique.

Greenhouse 
The stinging nettle can also be grown in controlled-environment agriculture systems, such as soil-less medium cultivations or aeroponics, which may achieve higher yields, standardize quality, and reduce harvesting costs and contamination.

Sting and treatment 

Urtica dioica produces its inflammatory effect on skin (stinging, burning sensation often called "contact urticaria") both by impaling the skin via spicules – causing mechanical irritation – and by biochemical irritants, such as histamine, serotonin, and acetylcholine, among other chemicals. Anti-itch drugs, usually in the form of creams containing antihistamines or hydrocortisone, may provide relief from nettle dermatitis. The term, contact urticaria, has a wider use in dermatology, involving dermatitis caused by various skin irritants and pathogens. 

Docks, especially the broad-leaf dock (Rumex obtusifolius) often grow in similar environments to stinging nettles and are regarded as a folk remedy to counteract the sting of a nettle, although there is no evidence of any chemical effect. It may be that the act of rubbing a dock leaf against a nettle sting acts as a distracting counterstimulation, or that belief in the dock's effect provides a placebo effect.

Uses

Culinary 

U. dioica has a flavour similar to spinach when cooked. Young plants were harvested by Native Americans and used as a cooked plant in spring when other food plants were scarce. Soaking stinging nettles in water or cooking removes the stinging chemicals from the plant, which allows them to be handled and eaten without injury. After the stinging nettle enters its flowering and seed-setting stages, the leaves develop gritty particles called cystoliths, which can irritate the kidneys and urinary tract. Cystoliths are made of calcium carbonate, and will not dissolve when boiled. Leaves harvested post-flowering must have their cystoliths broken down by acid, as in the fermentation process. In its peak season, nettle contains up to 25% protein, dry weight, which is high for a leafy green vegetable. The leaves are also dried and may then be used to make a herbal tea, as can also be done with the nettle's flowers.

Nettles can be used in a variety of recipes, such as polenta, pesto, and purée. Nettle soup is a common use of the plant, particularly in Northern and Eastern Europe.

Nettles are sometimes used in cheesemaking, such as for Cornish Yarg and as a flavouring in varieties of Gouda.

Nettles are used in Montenegro, Serbia, and Bosnia and Hercegovina as part of the dough filling for the börek pastry. The top baby leaves are selected and simmered, and then mixed with other ingredients such as herbs and rice, before being used as a filling between dough layers. Similarly, in Greece the tender leaves are often used, after simmering, as a filling for hortopita, which is similar to spanakopita, but with wild greens rather than spinach for filling.

Young nettles can also be used to make an alcoholic drink.

Competitive eating 
In the UK, an annual World Nettle Eating Championship draws thousands of people to Dorset, where competitors attempt to eat as much of the raw plant as possible. Competitors are given  stalks of the plant, from which they strip the leaves and eat them. Whoever strips and eats the most stinging nettle leaves in a fixed time is the winner. The competition dates back to 1986, when two neighbouring farmers attempted to settle a dispute about which had the worst infestation of nettles, and one of them said, "I'll eat any nettle of yours that's longer than mine."

Traditional medicine 
As Old English stiðe, nettle is one of the nine plants invoked in the pagan Anglo-Saxon Nine Herbs Charm, recorded in 10th-century traditional medicine. Nettle was believed to be a galactagogue – a substance that promotes lactation. Urtication, or flogging with nettles is the process of deliberately applying stinging nettles to the skin to provoke inflammation. An agent thus used was considered to be a rubefacient (something that causes redness), used as a folk remedy for treating rheumatism.

Chastisement 
In indigenous justice systems in Ecuador, urtication was used as punishment for severe crimes in 2010. The sentenced perpetrator of a crime was flogged with stinging nettle, in public, naked, whilst being showered with freezing cold water.

Textiles and fibre 

Nettle stems contain a bast fibre that has been traditionally used for the same purposes as linen and is produced by a similar retting process. Unlike cotton, nettles grow easily without pesticides. The fibres are coarser, however.

Historically, nettles have been used to make clothing for almost 3,000 years, as ancient nettle textiles from the Bronze Age have been found in Denmark. It is widely believed that German Army uniforms were almost all made from nettle during World War I due to a potential shortage of cotton, although there is little evidence to support this. More recently, companies in Austria, Germany, and Italy have started to produce commercial nettle textiles.

The fibre content in nettle shows a high variability and reaches from below 1% to 17%. Under middle-European conditions, stems yield typically between 45 and 55 dt / ha (decitons per hectare), which is comparable to flax stem yield. Due to the variable fibre content, the fibre yields vary between 0.2 and 7 dt / ha, but the yields are normally in the range between 2 and 4 dt / ha. Fibre varieties are normally cloning varieties and therefore planted from vegetative propagated plantlets. Direct seeding is possible, but leads to great heterogeneity in maturity.

Nettles may be used as a dye-stuff, producing yellow from the roots, or yellowish green from the leaves.

Feed

Nutrient contents 
Fresh leaves contain approximately 82.4% water, 17.6% dry matter, 5.5% protein, 0.7 to 3.3% fat, and 7.1% carbohydrates. Mature leaves contain about 40% α- linolenic acid, a valuable omega-3 acid. For exact fatty acid contents see Table 1. Seeds contain much more fatty acid than leaves.

Minerals (Ca, K, Mg, P, Si, S, Cl) and trace elements (Ti, 80 ppm, Mn, Cu, Fe) contents depend mostly on the soil and the season.

Carotenoids can be found primarily in the leaves, where different forms of lutein, xanthophyll and carotene are present (Table 2). Some carotenes are precursors of vitamin A (retinol), their retinol equivalents RE or retinol activity equivalents per g dry weight are 1.33 for mature leaves and 0.9 for young leaves. Nettle contains much less carotenes and retinol than carrots, which contain 8.35 RE per g fresh weight. Depending on the batch and the leave and stem content, nettle contains only traces of zeaxanthin or between 20–60 mg/kg of dry matter. Nettle contains ascorbic acid (vitamin C), riboflavin (vitamin B2), pantothenic acid, vitamin K1 and tocopherols (vitamin E). The highest vitamin contents can be found in the leaves.

Poultry: Egg yolk colouring in laying hens 
In laying hens, nettle can be used as an egg yolk colorant instead of artificial pigments or other natural pigments (derived from marigold for yellow). Nettle has high carotenoid contents, especially lutein, β-carotene and zeaxanthin, of which lutein and zeaxanthin act as yellow pigments. Feeding as little as 6.25 g dry nettle per kg feed is as effective as the synthetic pigments to colour the egg yolk. Feeding nettle has no detrimental effect on the performance of the laying hens or on the general quality of eggs.

Ruminants 
Ruminants avoid fresh stinging nettles; however, if the nettles are wilted or dry, voluntary intake can be high.

Use in agriculture / horticulture 
In the European Union and United Kingdom, nettle extract can be used as an insecticide, fungicide, and acaricide under Basic Substance regulations. As an insecticide nettle extract can be used for the control of codling moth, diamondback moth, and spider mites. As a fungicide, it can be used for the control of Pythium root rot, powdery mildew, early blight, late blight, Septoria blight, Alternaria leaf spot, and grey mould.

Gardening 
Nettles have a number of other uses in the vegetable garden, including the potential for encouraging beneficial insects. Since nettles prefer to grow in phosphorus-rich and nitrogen rich soils that have recently been disturbed (and thus aerated), the growth of nettles is an indicator that an area has high fertility (especially phosphate and nitrate), and thus is an indicator to gardeners as to the quality of the soil.

Nettles contain nitrogenous compounds, so are used as a compost activator or can be used to make a liquid fertilizer, which although low in phosphate, is useful in supplying magnesium, sulphur, and iron. They are also one of the few plants that can tolerate, and flourish in, soils rich in poultry droppings.

The stinging nettle is the red admiral caterpillar's primary host plant and can attract migrating red admiral butterflies to a garden. U. dioica can be a troubling weed, and mowing can increase plant density. Regular and persistent tilling will greatly reduce its numbers, and the use of herbicides such as 2,4-D and glyphosate are effective control measures.

Culture 
In Great Britain and Ireland, U. dioica and the annual nettle Urtica urens are the only common stinging plants and have found a place in several figures of speech in the English language. Shakespeare's Hotspur urges that "out of this nettle, danger, we pluck this flower, safety" (Henry IV, Part 1, Act II Scene 3). The figure of speech "to grasp the nettle" probably originated from Aesop's fable "The Boy and the Nettle". In Seán O'Casey's Juno and the Paycock, one of the characters quotes Aesop "Gently touch a nettle and it'll sting you for your pains/Grasp it as a lad of mettle and soft as silk remains". The metaphor may refer to the fact that if a nettle plant is grasped firmly rather than brushed against, it does not sting so readily, because the hairs are crushed down flat and do not penetrate the skin so easily.

In the German language, the idiom sich in die Nesseln setzen, or to sit in nettles, means to get into trouble.
In Hungarian, the idiom csalánba nem üt a mennykő, the lightning bolt does not strike into nettles, alludes to the belief that bad people escape trouble or the devil looks after his own. The same idiom exists in the Serbian language – неће гром у коприве. In Dutch, a netelige situatie means a predicament. In French, the idiom faut pas pousser mémé dans les orties (do not push granny into the nettles) means that we should be careful not to abuse a situation. The name urticaria for hives comes from the Latin name of nettle (Urtica, from urere, to burn).

The English word 'nettled', meaning irritated or angry, is derived from 'nettle'.

There is a common idea in Great Britain that the nettle was introduced by the Romans. The idea was mentioned by William Camden in his book Britannia of 1586. However, in 2011, an early Bronze Age burial cist on Whitehorse Hill, Dartmoor, Devon was excavated. The cist dated from between 1730 and 1600 BC. It contained various high value beads as well as fragments of a sash made from nettle fibre. It is possible that the sash was traded from mainland Europe, but perhaps more probable that it was locally made.

See also 
Nettles in folklore

References

Further reading 

Schofield, Janice J. (1998). Nettles 
Thiselton-Dyer, T. F., (1889). The Folk-Lore of Plants.
Glawe, G. A. (2006). Sex ratio variation and sex determination in Urtica diocia.

External links 

Flora of China: Urtica dioica

dioica
Fiber plants
Leaf vegetables
Flora of Europe
Flora of temperate Asia
Flora of North Africa
Flora of North America
Medicinal plants
Dioecious plants
Plants described in 1753
Taxa named by Carl Linnaeus
Plants used in Native American cuisine